, better known as Mr. Sakurada, The Dragonmaster, and as the Japanese version of , was a Japanese professional wrestler. He was best known for his work in Stampede Wrestling, National Wrestling Alliance, and World Championship Wrestling. Sakurada was also highly regarded by Bret Hart as one of his most significant trainers alongside Katsui Adachi or Mr. Hito, with whom he taught extensively in Hart Dungeon.

Sumo wrestling career

Kazuo Sakurada was born on September 26, 1948, in Abashiri, Hokkaido. After graduating from junior high school, he joined the Tatsunami stable to pursue sumo. While there, he first met future professional wrestler Genichiro Tenryu. He made his sumo debut in January 1964 under his last name (櫻田). In September 1966, he changed his shikona to  Hiroshi Abashiri (網走洋　一男). In May 1969, he changed his shikona again to Midorimine (翠巒). Throughout his seven-year career in sumo, his highest rank was Makushita 13, and his only tournament championship win was in September 1966, with an undefeated record of seven wins. In March 1971, Sakurada retired from sumo wrestling.

Career record

Professional wrestling career

Early years (1971–1976)
Kazuo Sakurada debuted on June 21, 1971, in the old Japan Pro Wrestling Alliance against Kim Duk. On March 8, 1973, he became involved in a shoot when his mid-card match against rookie Tsutomu Oshiro went horribly wrong and Sakurada began beating Oshiro severely, knocking him out of the ring. Oshiro was going to jump to New Japan Pro-Wrestling along with his mentor Seiji Sakaguchi and friend Kengo Kimura, and Sakurada took actions into his own hands, blaming them for jumping ship. When the JPWA closed in April 1973 Sakurada joined All Japan Pro Wrestling.

In 1975, he joined International Wrestling Enterprise.

United States and Stampede Wrestling (1976–1981) 
In 1976, Sakurada made his North America debut in Texas. Now as Mr. Sakurada, he found his earliest success in Stampede Wrestling. He defeated two-time champion Leo Burke to win his first and only Stampede North American Heavyweight Championship on May 20, 1978, in Edmonton, Alberta. He held the title for a little over three months before losing to Paddy Ryan on September 1. He then became highly regarded in Stampede's tag team division, defeating Keith and Bret Hart in early 1979 to win his first Stampede International Tag Team Championship with Mr. Hito. Their second win came later on the same year after the defeat of Dory Funk Jr. and Larry Lane, only to be toppled once again by the Hart brothers. By 1980, Hito had moved on to singles competition, leaving Sakurada to form a team with Kasavubu. They, too, defeated the Harts, marking Sakurada's third and final tag team championship reign in Stampede. This reign would be ended at the hands of the Harts' brother-in-law Jim Neidhart and Hercules Ayala that same year.

Continental Wrestling Association (1981–1982) 
In the early 1980s, Sakurada had started working in various southern American promotions, starting with the Continental Wrestling Association in Memphis. During this time, he began using the "Kendo Nagasaki'" gimmick, a Japanese Samurai character previously made famous by British wrestler Peter Thornley dating back to 1964. This incarnation was vastly different however; rather than wearing a mask, Sakurada wore face paint and a highly alternate style altogether. His fierce character also made famous the Asian mist and frequently employed the Kendo stick as his signature weapon. As Nagasaki, he found a most prominent win in his victory over Jerry Lawler for the NWA/AWA Southern Heavyweight Title in 1982. He would lose the title back to Lawler before pursuing new territory.

National Wrestling Alliance (1982–1989) 
After the Memphis territory, Nagasaki worked for NWA territories World Wrestling Council, Florida Championship Wrestling and Southeastern Championship Wrestling. He faced some of the top competition in the Florida territory throughout 1983 and 1984, and on January 22, 1984, he captured the NWA Florida Heavyweight Championship from Mike Rotunda. This kicked off a rivalry with the reputable Billy Jack Haynes, resulting in his title victory over Nagasaki in March of the same year. During his time with CWF, Nagasaki would also tag team with White Ninja. Following his departure from CWF, Nagasaki briefly worked for Von Erich's World Class Championship Wrestling in the mid '80s as "White Ninja", frequently partnering with "Super Black Ninja". During the 1980s, Nagasaki teamed with Mr. Pogo as "the Ninja Express". The Ninja Express briefly returned to Japan to participate in New Japan Pro-Wrestling's Japan Cup tag team tournament in late 1987, finishing in second-to-last place.

World Championship Wrestling (1989-1990) 
In 1989, he performed on WCW television, using the ring name "The Dragonmaster". While there, he joined Gary Hart's J-Tex Corporation stable consisting of Terry Funk, Dick Slater, Buzz Sawyer, and The Great Muta. This heel group, conceived in July 1989, feuded with the Four Horsemen until ultimately disbanding in February 1990 after a final steel cage match at the Clash of the Champions X: Texas Shootout, a match largely overshadowed by the other Horsemen turning heel on Sting.

Return to Japan (1990–2000) 
In 1990, after so many years competing in North America, he returned to Japan as Kendo Nagasaki. He first joined Frontier Martial-Arts Wrestling, but later joined Super World of Sports. Following SWS's collapse in 1992, he formed his own promotion, NOW (Network of Wrestling). In 1995, he closed NOW, and with a new business partner Shinya Kojika, formed Big Japan Pro Wrestling. Nagasaki teamed with Chris Michaels defeating Damian Stone and Joel Hartgood ECW's Big Ass Extreme Bash. After leaving BJW in 1999, Nagasaki wrestled semi-actively until 2000 where he had his last match on July 7, 2000, teaming with Ichiro Yaguchi, Shoji Nakamaki, and Yase Yaguchi in a loss to Atsushi Onita, Exciting Yoshida, Mitsunobu Kikuzawa, and Naoshi Sano on an Onita Pro show.

Mixed martial arts
On September 26, 1995, in Setagaya, Tokyo, Sakurada lost a mixed martial arts match to American kickboxer Zane Frazier via knockout punch at Shooto: Vale Tudo Perception. At the time, Sakurada had the reputation by pro wrestling insiders as being one of the toughest wrestlers in a street fight, as well as a shooter. This was possibly one of the reasons why he was chosen to take this fight, despite being 47 years old at the time.

Mixed martial arts record

|-
|Loss
|align=center|0-1
| Zane Frazier
|KO (punch)
|Shooto: Vale Tudo Perception
|
|align=center|1
|align=center|0:36
|Tokyo, Japan
|
|-

Death
On January 12, 2020, Sakurada died at age 71 due to arrythmia.

Championships and accomplishments
Championship Wrestling from Florida
NWA Florida Heavyweight Championship (1 time)
NWA Florida Tag Team Championship (1 time) - with Mr. Hito
Continental Wrestling Association
AWA Southern Heavyweight Championship (1 time)
NWA Big Time Wrestling
NWA American Tag Team Championship (3 times) – with Mr. Hito (1 time) with Chan Chang
Pacific Northwest Wrestling
NWA Pacific Northwest Tag Team Championship (1 time) – with Colonel DeBeers
Pro Wrestling Illustrated
PWI ranked him #250 of the 500 best wrestlers in the PWI 500 in 1994
PWI ranked him #307 of the 500 best singles wrestlers during the PWI Years in 2003
Stampede Wrestling
NWA International Tag Team Championship/Stampede International Tag Team Championship (3 times) – with Mr. Hito (2) and Kasavudu (1)
Stampede North American Heavyweight Championship (1 time)
Stampede Wrestling Hall of Fame
Texas Wrestling Federation
TWF Asian Heavyweight Championship (1 time)
World Wrestling Council
WWC World Tag Team Championship (4 times) – with Mr. Pogo

Footnotes

References

External links
Wrestling Information Archive
Bret Hart’s Calgary Sun column for February 20, 2004
CW Archives - Mr. Sakurada
 

1948 births
Japanese male mixed martial artists
Mixed martial artists utilizing Sumo
Mixed martial artists utilizing wrestling
Japanese male professional wrestlers
2020 deaths
The First Family (professional wrestling) members
Japanese sumo wrestlers
Stampede Wrestling alumni
NWA Florida Heavyweight Champions
NWA Florida Tag Team Champions
Stampede Wrestling International Tag Team Champions
Stampede Wrestling North American Heavyweight Champions